NGC 5035 is a lenticular galaxy located in the constellation Virgo about 99 million light-years from the Milky Way. It was discovered by American astronomer Edward Singleton Holden in 1881.

Synonyms 
 MCG -3-34-28
 NPM1G -16.039
 PGC 46068

References 

Lenticular galaxies
Virgo (constellation)
NGC objects